St. Peter Line is water transport company owned by Moby SPL Limited, a Maltese-registered shipping company, which operated services from Helsinki, St. Petersburg, Stockholm and Tallinn. The company was founded in 2010 with it starting operations in April of that year. In December 2010, St. Peter Line acquired the cruiseferry named Pride of Bilbao from Irish Continental Group for €37.7m for a new route between St Petersburg and Stockholm. Limited passenger services were run in 2018, but most of the 2019 programme was cancelled. With the start of the Coronavirus pandemic, the company's only vessel was assigned to special duties in the Kola River in Russia's Murmansk Oblast, providing emergency floating accommodation for workers in an area badly affected by COVID-19. In 2022 the ship was withdrawn because of the conflict in Ukraine, transferred to Moby Lines and sailed to Messina for refurbishment. She was set to return to service in the Mediterranean. No information about opening up St. Peter Line again has been announced.

Routes 
St. Peter Line operated two routes across the Gulf of Finland.

Fleet

Former vessels

References

External links 
 
 

Ferry companies of Russia
Ferry companies of Sweden
Ferry companies of Finland
Ferry companies of Malta
Shipping companies of Malta
Cruise lines